Aasha is a 1982 Indian Malayalam film, directed by Augustine Prakash. The film stars Kalaranjini, Shanavas, Raveendran and Adoor Bhasi in the lead roles. The film has musical score by A. T. Ummer.

Cast
Kalaranjini as Aasha
Shanavas as Boban
Raveendran as Kabir Mohemmed
Adoor Bhasi as Willy
Maniyanpilla Raju as Sunil Kumar
Rajkumar as Lal
Ranipadmini as Neena Cheriyan
Manavalan Joseph as Parameshwara Iyyer Swami
Sabitha Anand as Rasiya
Jose Prakash as Mathew Cheriyan
Lalu Alex as Doctor
P. R. Menon

Soundtrack
The music was composed by A. T. Ummer and the lyrics were written by Dr. Pavithran.

References

External links
 

1982 films
1980s Malayalam-language films